Passiflora serratifolia is a species of Passiflora from Suriname.

References

External links
 
 

serratifolia